Siekiera, motyka ("Axe, Hoe") is a famous Polish Resistance military and street-level protest song from the period of World War II. It became the most popular song of occupied Warsaw, and then, of the entire occupied Poland. The song was inspired by an old humorous folk-tune performed already in 1917 with different and constantly changing lyrics, adapted for the army in a 1938 publication under a different title.

Creation
The wartime lyrics of the song were created around August 1942 in Warsaw, by a member of ZWZ Anna Jachnina, young wife of an army captain from before the invasion. It quickly spawned many variants. In 1943 it was published in print by the Polish resistance underground presses, in the Posłuchajcie ludzie... [Listen, folks], book, one of the bibuła publications of Propaganda Commission (Komisja Propagandy) of Armia Krajowa (Home Army). The music - and in part the lyrics - was based on an existing melody and the words of older songs.

Performance and influence
Germans from late 1942 penalized singing of that song (and similar ones), but sung poetry, ballads and other patriotic songs would remain popular in occupied Poland throughout the period. Siekiera, motyka would remain the most popular patriotic, occupation period street song of occupied Poland.

The song tells about the life in occupied Warsaw. A notable theme of the song, particularly strong in some variants, was the description of German practice of łapanka, the street round-ups of random passers-by.

The song was reprinted in several books and discs after the German occupation ended. The song was also featured in a movie Zakazane piosenki (Forbidden Songs) made in Poland in 1946.

Lyrics

References

External links
Music (mid file)

1942 songs
Polish patriotic songs
Protest songs
Songs of World War II
Polish-language songs